Nikhar Gaye Gulab Sare is a Pakistani television series directed by Asim Ali and written by  Nadia Akhtar  based on the novel of same name by  Shazia Chaudry . The show is produced by Momina Duraid.

The show was also broadcast in India on Zindagi from 27 May 2015 to 31 August 2015 under the title Gulon Mein Rang. It was also aired in Mauritius by MBC Network

Plot
Nikhar Gaye Hain Gulab Saare is the story of Shehryal (Mawra Hocane) who is committed to her cousin, Malik Duraab (Shamoon Abbasi). Shehryal doesn't like the spoiled brat Duraab, who proves to be a very abusive and extremist landlord. This drama also narrates the story of a girl Zarlala whose brother-in-law has lustful eyes upon her.

Cast
 Mawra Hocane as Sheharyal
 Imran Aslam as Sikandar 
 Faisal Rehman  as Sheharyal's eldest brother
 Naima Khan as Sheharyal's mother
 Zaheen Tahira as Badi Apa
 Shamoon Abbasi  as Malik Durab
 Sangeeta  as Badi Malkani  
 Hassan Niazi as Sheharyal's second brother
 Afshan Qureshi as Sikandar's mother
 Sabreen Hisbani as Saima
 Shazia Afgan
 Rashid Mehmood 
 Hashim Butt
 Sana Ismail
 Nasreen Kanwal

Awards
 Imran Aslam won best actor soap at 1st Hum Awards 2013.

Nominations
 Mawra Hocane was nominated for best actress soap at 1st Hum Awards 2013.
 Nominated for best soap series at 1st Hum Awards 2013.

See also
 Mar Jain Bhi To Kya

References

External links

2012 Pakistani television series debuts
Pakistani drama television series
Urdu-language television shows
Hum TV original programming
2012 Pakistani television series endings
Zee Zindagi original programming
Pakistani television dramas based on novels